Cubagua Island or Isla de Cubagua is the smallest and least populated of the three islands constituting the Venezuelan state of Nueva Esparta, after Margarita Island and Coche Island.

Geography

Topography
The highest elevation of the flat-topped island reaches .

Climate
It is dry and lacks surface water bodies (the only freshwater is found in small underground reservoirs). Temperatures are close to  year-round with little fluctuation.

Vegetation
The desert-like (xerophytic) vegetation of the essentially barren island includes a number of cactus species such as Cardón de Dato (Ritterocereus griseus), Buche, Melón de Cerro, Sabana o Monte (Melocactus caesius), Guamacho (Pereskia guamacho), and Opuntia tuna as well as a few legumes (family Fabaceae) such as Mesquite (Prosopis juliflora), Divi-divi (Caesalpinia coriaria), Poorman's Friend (Stylosanthes viscosa), and the Sangre Drago (Croton flavens).

Fauna
The island has small populations of hares, feral goats and a large population of dogs.

Transportation
The island of Cubagua has no streets or roads. The passage takes less than 2 hours. The boat landing pier is located at the eastern end of Playa Charagato, the main settlement of Cubagua.

A lighthouse marking Punta Charagato lies in the northeast to aid the Isla Margarita ferry and another lighthouse is situated at Punta Brasil in the northwest to aid the ferries of Punta de Piedras and Puerto la Cruz.

History
The first human settlement on Cubagua has been dated to 2325 BC, a time within the Meso-Indian Period (5000-1000 BC).

In 1498, Cubagua was sighted by Christopher Columbus along with Margarita island. Later in 1499 Spanish expeditions returned to exploit abundant pearl oysters, enslaving the indigenous people and harvesting the pearls intensively. They became one of the most valuable resources of the incipient Spanish Empire in the Americas between 1508 and 1531, by which time the local indigenous population and the pearl oysters had been devastated. In 1528, Cristóbal Guerra founded the city of Nueva Cádiz, the first settlement to hold the title of "city" in Venezuela. The city became a synonym for the suppression by the Hispanic Conquistadores in South America. Nueva Cádiz, which reached a population between 1,000 and 1,500, was destroyed in an earthquake followed by a tsunami in 1541. The ruins have been declared a National Monument of Venezuela in 1979.

Administration
Cubagua is part of the municipality of Tubores, one of 11 municipalities of the state of Nueva Esparta.

Population
Human activity dates from the 24th century BC, but the first people did not settle here in a permanent fashion. Instead the island was used as a source of oysters, for food, and for pearls. The lack of vegetation or fresh water made permanent settlement nearly impossible. Today the island still has temporary fisherman, but few to no permanent residents.

According to an unofficial population census conducted by the Instituto del Patrimonio Cultural in August 2007, the island had 51 residents of which 19 were children. The population resides in the following 4 communities in the island's northwest:

Playa Falucho
Playa Charagato (the largest settlement)
Punta Charagato
Punta la Cabecera (close to the ruins Nueva Cádiz)

In addition, on some maps a settlement called Punta Arenas appears in the Southwest. Satellite images reveal about 5 buildings at that site. A small settlement of about 4 buildings can be made out about midway between Punta La Horca (the westernmost point of Cubagua) and Punta Arenas south of Punta El Lamparo. A pair of buildings can be seen on the southern bay of Manglecito just east of Punta Manglecito.

The population exceeds 300 during the year when seasonal fishermen from the Venezuelan mainland state of Sucre are included.

In popular culture
In 2015, Venezuelan director Jorge Thielen Armand made a short documentary about the island of Cubagua, Flor de la Mar.

See also
 Cariaco Basin

References

External links

Information about Cubagua Island (Spanish)
detailed map (Geology)

Geography of Nueva Esparta
Venezuelan islands of the Leeward Antilles